Henry Doubleday (1 July 1808 – 29 June 1875) was an English entomologist and ornithologist.

Henry Doubleday was the eldest son of Quaker and grocer Benjamin Doubleday and his wife Mary of Epping, Essex. He and his brother Edward Doubleday spent their childhood collecting natural history specimens in Epping Forest. He lived at the same time as his cousin Henry Doubleday (1810-1902) the scientist and horticulturist. There is a blue plaque to him at the corner of High Street and Buttercross Lane, Epping.

He was the author of the first catalogue of British butterflies and moths, Synonymic List of the British Lepidoptera (1847–1850). He named a number of new species of moths, including the pigmy footman, Ashworth's rustic and marsh oblique-barred. His moth collection remains intact at the Natural History Museum.

Sources
 Oxford Dictionary of National Biography. OUP (2004).

External links
Full text of Andrew Murray's Catalogue of the Doubleday Collection of Lepidoptera Part I. British Lepidoptera and Part II. European Lepidoptera
A Synonymic List of All the British Butterflies and Moths
Dunning, J.W. (March 1877) "Biographical Notice". The Entomologist.

1808 births
1875 deaths
19th-century British biologists
19th-century English people
English lepidopterists
English ornithologists
English naturalists
English Quakers
People from Epping